Inioteuthis japonica is a species of bobtail squid native to the western Pacific Ocean, specifically the waters off China, Taiwan, and southern Japan.

I. japonica grows to 20 mm in mantle length.

The type specimen was collected off Japan. It was originally deposited at the Muséum National d'Histoire Naturelle in Paris, but is no longer extant.

References

External links

Bobtail squid
Cephalopods described in 1845